NGC 5473 is a lenticular galaxy in the constellation Ursa Major. It was discovered on April 14, 1789 by the astronomer William Herschel. Located roughly 85 million light-years (26.2 megaparsecs) away, it is part of a small galaxy group including NGC 5475 and NGC 5485.

References

External links 

Ursa Major (constellation)
5473
Lenticular galaxies